Batrachedra filicicola, also known as the ring fern spore-eater, is a species of moth of the family Batrachedridae. It is endemic to New Zealand and has been collected in the North Island. The larvae of this species feed on the spores of the silver fern. Adults are on the wing in November and December. This species is attracted to light and has also been collected in the day by sweeping silver fern fonds.

Taxonomy 
This species was first described by Edward Meyrick in 1917 using material collected by George Hudson at Karori on tree-ferns in November. George Hudson discussed and illustrated this species in his 1928 book The Butterflies and Moths of New Zealand. The lectotype specimen is held at the Natural History Museum, London.

Description 

The mature larva of this species is small and white coloured and grows up to 5 mm long.

Meyrick described the male adult of this species as follows:

Distribution 
B. filicicola is endemic to New Zealand. It has been collected in Wellington and in the Hawkes Bay.

Biology and behaviour 
This species is on the wing in November and December. This species is attracted to light. It has been collected in sunshine by sweeping the fonds of its host the silver fern. It is a fast runner and makes short, rapid flights. Adults have been collected by sweeping its larval hosts.

Host species 
The larva of this moth feed on the spores of Cyathea dealbata and on Paesia scabrula.

References

Batrachedridae
Moths of New Zealand
Moths described in 1917
Endemic fauna of New Zealand
Taxa named by Edward Meyrick
Endemic moths of New Zealand